Fort Finney may refer to
Fort Finney (Indiana) renamed Fort Steuben
Fort Finney (Ohio)